Dmitry Borisovich Bosov (March 27, 1968 – May 6, 2020) was a Russian businessman. Founder, majority shareholder and chairman of the Board of Directors of ALLTECH Group. The main assets of Dmitry Bosov were the Sibanthracite Group and VostokCoal MC.

He had been Head of supervisory board of HC Sibir Novosibirsk since 2008.

In 2019, he was ranked 102nd in the Forbes list of richest businessmen in Russia, with a fortune of 950 million dollars.

In 2020, he was ranked 1851st in the Forbes list of world's billionaires, with a fortune of 1.1 billion dollars.

Early life and education 
Dmitry Borisovich Bosov was born on March 27, 1968, in Barnaul. His father was Head of Sales at the Transmash plant, and later - deputy general director at the Kristall plant. His mother was a teacher of English, a professor at a Moscow university.

In 1991, he graduated with honors from the faculty of Radio Electronics and Laser Technology at Bauman Moscow State Technical University (MSTU). He studied Economic Sciences and received a doctorate.

Career 
In 1991, he founded CJSC PIF, the Moscow representative office of the Kristall plant, where he worked as deputy director for two years and then as executive director. In 1993, he became the president of Polyexport LLP (Foreign Trade Association).

From 1995, he was director of the TransWorld Group Moscow office (later - Trans World Commodities).

From 1997 to 2000 he was one of the shareholders and a member of the board of directors of the Krasnoyarsk Aluminum Plant.

In 2000, he sold his KrAZ shares. After that, together with his colleagues at Bauman MSTU, he established ALLTECH Group and took up investment projects in Russia. He was the chairman of the Board of the Group. Among the projects implemented are, in 2006, consolidation and further sale to Renova one of the largest electrode plants in Russia. In early 2004, the ALLTECH Group acquired more than 20% of the shares in West Siberian Resources Ltd (WSR). The company significantly increased production (in 4 years the company's market capitalization increased almost 20 times) and in 2008 West Siberian Resources merged with Alliance Oil Company.

His coal business began with the acquisition of shares in Siberian Anthracite JSC (the world's largest producer of anthracite UHG, located in Novosibirsk Region). He was the chairman of the board of directors of VostokCoal MC.

Since 2008, he has been Head of supervisory board of Sibir Ice Hockey Club.

In 2015, he established the Blackspace group of companies in Indonesia, obtaining licenses for coal, nickel, manganese and bauxite mining sites. Since then, Blackspace has implemented two large projects - the development of a coal deposit in Central Kalimantan and the construction of a ferronickel plant on the island of Kabena.

Some media outlets mentioned Bosov's connection with Boris Berezovsky, with whom he supported Viktor Yushchenko and Yulia Tymoshenko during the campaign for the election of the President of Ukraine. Bosov himself denied this, stating that “...the only business I participated in with Berezovsky was the Internet company CityLine. He was the first to invest in it. The company was run by my friends Emelyan Zakharov, Demian Kudryavtsev and others. In 1999, they made me an offer to become a co-investor. In 2001 we sold the company and earned a decent amount of money”.

In news in 2019 was noted information attack on Dmitry Bosov, conducted mainly by the forces of the Telegram-channel Nezygar.

Business

ALLTECH Group 
A private direct investment company, established by Dmitry Bosov and his classmates from university, in 1993.

In 2007, ALLTECH launched the Pechora LNG project (a comprehensive project to develop the Kumzhinskoye and Korovinskoye fields in the Nenets Autonomous District). In 2015, Rosneft Oil Company entered the project, taking a 50% share in the joint venture. In 2018, Rosneft withdrew from the joint project with ALLTECH.

In 2018, ALLTECH Group merged its coal assets with Sibanthracite Group.

Another ALLTECH project is real estate: the development of the ARTPLAY Design Center and several real estate projects in the Moscow region.

Sibanthracite Group 
Sibanthracite Group p is the world's largest producer of anthracite UHG and is a leading Russian producer of metallurgical coal. The group was established in 2018, uniting the largest coal companies of the Novosibirsk region - Siberian Anthracite JSC and LLC Open-Pit Mine Vostochny LLC, as well as a large coal enterprise in the Kemerovo region - Open-Pit Mine Kiyzassky LLC.

In April 2019, the Sibanthracite Group announced the financial and production results of its activities for RSBC for 2018: production - 24.1 million tons (four times more than in 2014). Revenue - 132.8 billion rubles (an increase of 1.9 times year on year). The total amount of taxes assessed is 12.5 billion rubles, the profit on tax amounted to 8.4 billion rubles. Spending on social and charitable programs - 1.9 billion rubles. By 2022, Sibanthracite plans to produce 58 million tons of coal and anthracite.

As stated on the group's website, one of the group's priorities is to ensure industrial safety and social support for its employees. In 2018, 86 million rubles and 111.4 million rubles respectively were allocated for these purposes.

One of the most promising projects of the Group is their participation in the construction of the Severomuisk tunnel. Dmitry Bosov announced his readiness to participate in this project in a letter to the President of the Russian Federation, Vladimir Putin, on March 11, 2018.

According to media reports, Sibanthracite is negotiating the purchase of multifunctional loading and shipment complex "North".

In 2018, RBC newspaper wrote that the owner of Neftegazholding, Eduard Hudaynatov, was interested in buying Sibanthracite. Sibanthracite denied plans to sell.

Meanwhile, sharp criticism in the media for the negative impact on the environment is blamed on the open-pit mine Kiyzassky. After the incorporation of open-pit mine Kiyzassky into the SibanthraciteGroup, the former CEO of the mine, Nikolay Zarubin, was dismissed. According to sources, the main reason for the dismissal was a violation of environmental legislation. In interview with RBC, the head of Sibanthracite Barsky clarified that there are no threats to the company's work.

In April 2019, Sibanthracite announced that the construction time of the Severomuisky tunnel on the Baikal-Amur Magistrale would be 5 years.

In February 2021, it became known that Sibanthracite was bought by the company of the Russian-Armenian investor Albert Avdolyan - presumably for $1 billion.

VostokCoal MC 
VostokCoal MC on a parity basis belongs to Dmitry Bosov and Alexander Isaev (chairman of the board). 
VostokCoal specializes in creating new coal and infrastructure projects. At the moment, the company, in partnership with Rostec, a state corporation, is building the Vera Port coal terminal (Primorsky Krai) and is preparing to start production at the Ogodginskoecoal field, the largest in the Russian Far East. The Arctic Mining Company (AGK), part of the VostokCoal MC structure, is implementing a project to begin developing coal deposits on the Taimyr Peninsula.

Earlier, representatives of VostokCoal MC stated that by 2023 production at Taimyr would reach 30 million tons. However, as reported by the media, these plans were revised downwards due to the lack of a proven resource base.

As the Telegram Nezygar reported on April 17, 2019, the UFSB for the Krasnoyarsk region opened a criminal case against the Arctic Mining Company (AGK) on April 8, 2019. According to Nezygar, company managers are suspected of illegal coal deals in the absence of a coal mining license. One of the grounds for initiating the case was the results of the inspection of the AGK by Rosprirodnadzor (Federal Service for Supervision of Natural Resource Usage) in 2017. In the same year, Rosprirodnadzor fined AGK 954 million Rubles, stating that it was conducting illegal coal mining. The Arctic Mining Company challenged the audit results in court.

Personal life 
Bosov was married with Katerina Bosova and had five children.

He died in Usovo, Moscow Oblast, on May 6, 2020. He was found with a gunshot wound to the head, it might have been a suicide.

References 

1968 births
2020 deaths
People from Barnaul
Russian billionaires
20th-century Russian businesspeople
21st-century Russian businesspeople
2020 suicides
Suicides by firearm in Russia